Pioneers of the West is a 1940 American Western "Three Mesquiteers" B-movie directed by Lester Orlebeck.

Cast 
 Robert Livingston as Stony Brooke
 Raymond Hatton as Rusty Joslin
 Duncan Renaldo as Renaldo
 Noah Beery as Judge Platt
 Beatrice Roberts as Anna Bailey
 George Cleveland as Dr. Bailey
 Lane Chandler as Steve Carson
 Hal Taliaferro as Jed Clark
 Yakima Canutt as Nolan
 John Dilson as Morgan

References

External links 

1940 films
1940 Western (genre) films
American Western (genre) films
American black-and-white films
Republic Pictures films
Three Mesquiteers films
Films directed by Lester Orlebeck
1940s English-language films
1940s American films